The siege of Antalya in March 1207 was the successful Seljuk capture of the city of Attalia (today Antalya, Turkey), a port in southern-western Asia Minor. The capture of port gave the Turks another path into the Mediterranean although it would be another 100 years before the Turks made any serious attempts into the sea. 

The port had come under the control of a Tuscan adventurer by the name of Aldobrandini, who had been in the service of the Byzantine Empire, but reputedly mistreated Egyptian merchants at that port. The inhabitants appealed to the regent of Cyprus, Gautier de Montbeliard, who occupied the town but was unable to prevent the Seljuk Turks from ravaging the adjacent countryside. Sultan Kaykhusraw I took the town by storm in March 1207, and put his lieutenant Mubariz al-Din Ertokush ibn 'Abd Allah in charge as its governor.

References 

Antalya
History of Antalya
Antalya
Antalya
Conflicts in 1207
1207 in Asia